Sulestes is an extinct genus of Deltatheridiidae from Cretaceous of Uzbekistan.

References

Prehistoric metatherians
Turonian life
Cretaceous mammals of Asia
Fossils of Uzbekistan
Bissekty Formation
Fossil taxa described in 1985
Prehistoric mammal genera